The Iowa Cow War of 1931 involved violent disputes over the testing of cows for bovine tuberculosis. After distrustful farmers tried and failed to repeal the testing program, they gathered in numbers to block tests from taking place. The farmers believed that the test might infect cows with tuberculosis or make pregnant cows have spontaneous abortions. They also believed that the testing was unconstitutional. The owner of Muscatine radio station KTNT, Norman G. Baker, spread misinformation which resulted in more farmers protesting testing, sometimes causing violence. The Iowa Cow War came to a conclusion when 31 Iowa National Guard units were deployed to stop the protesting. Two farmers were arrested for their actions during the conflict.

Background
Bovine tuberculosis was an issue for Iowans prior to the eradication of the disease starting in 1929. In 1894, an Iowa veterinarian said that tuberculosis was the main issue that his office faced. People often did not understand the danger of tuberculosis in cows due to the long period of incubation and its effects. Many respected medical professionals thought that cows were unable to transmit the disease to people, including Robert Koch, who completed early research on tuberculosis. The State of Iowa required the tests to reduce the frequency with which dairy cattle with tuberculosis would contaminate the milk supply and cause milk-drinking people to contract the disease. The program was financed by a property tax levy of up to 3 mills. In 1929, the Iowa State Legislature passed a law stating that all cows, whether used for dairy or meat, had to be tested for bovine tuberculosis. Iowa farmers, who did not trust the tests, were opposed to the law. The farmers believed that the test might infect cows with tuberculosis or make pregnant cows have spontaneous abortions. They also thought that the test was against the United States Constitution, but this was dismissed by the Iowa Supreme Court in 1930.

Veterinarians, who were approved by the State of Iowa, injected an antigen under the base of the cows' tails. After 72 hours, the veterinarians would see if the cows had any reactions to the antigen, such as swelling. Cows that reacted to the antigen were slaughtered and the farmers were paid an indemnity. The farmers did not receive the market share of their cows after they were slaughtered with the slaughter value being subtracted from the appraised value. Farmers asserted that the test lowered milk quality and the cows' release of milk.

Early protests
In relation to the testing, Muscatine KTNT radio station owner Norman G. Baker spread misinformation in southeastern Iowa about medical professionals, Iowa politicians, farming magazines, and Iowa universities. Baker's words caused farmers to rebel in Cedar County. In February 1931, two years after the adoption of the testing law, 1,000 farmers traveled by train from Tipton, Iowa, to the Iowa State Capitol in Des Moines. On arrival, they demanded that the Iowa Legislature make the tests optional. After the Legislature refused to do so, the farmers decided to act on their own.

On March 9, 1931, over 500 people protested south of Tipton at a farm owned by E. C. Mitchell, who previously worked with four other farmers to resist the testing of their cows. Iowa veterinarians and 20 nearby police officers were at farmer William C. Butterbrodt's farm to test his cows for tuberculosis, northeast of Tipton. Almost 1,000 protestors traveled to Butterbrodt's farm to block tests from being performed, although no acts of violence occurred. Another meeting was held at the Iowa State Capitol on March 19, 1931, with more than 1,500 people attending. Iowa Governor Dan Turner kept the mandatory testing in place. Veterinarian Peter Malcolm was forced off of E. C. Mitchell's farm in Cedar County on April 10, 1931, to review the tests of five cows. 75 protestors confronted Malcolm and several officials, resulting in Iowa agent Earl Gaughenbaugh telling the farmers to leave. After a cow was identified as having tuberculosis, Mitchell had two protestors throw Malcolm off the land. Assistant Attorney General Oral Swift was pushed against a barbed wire fence. Mitchell said that he only allowed the testing to lead to "lead them on". Newspaper reporters were unable to write stories about the Mitchell farm incident due to protestors and The Des Moines Register and Tribune took photographs from the air that showed automobiles that were parked to prevent their cows from being tested. Malcolm's tests on Mitchell's farm were going to expire soon and Turner met with some protesters in Iowa City. The National Guard was deployed to Cedar Rapids on the morning of Malcolm reviewing the test results, but they were sent home shortly after on the same day. The final step of testing succeeded without any issues and one bull had a reaction. The 15 farmers that met with Turner in Iowa City had an assembly at Butterbrodt's farm on April 14, 1931. Turner said that only the farmers' elected representative could change the testing law. Smaller conflicts continued to happen with veterinarians being forced from farms.

Cow War
The Cow War happened during the fall of 1931, with most of it taking place in Cedar County, Iowa. On September 21, 1931, when state officials left the courthouse at noon, protestors followed them to Jacob W. Lenker's farm. 300 or 400 farmers went to Lenker's with crudely made weapons to attack 63 or 65 officers and two veterinarians. The farmers threw mud and rocks at the officers, while also swinging clubs and slashing the officers' tires. The farmers also had pitchforks. Tear gas was used against the farmers, but there was not much effect. Malcolm's tires were punctured, his gas line was slashed, and they put mud in his radiator. The chief of the Iowa Division of Criminal Investigation, James Risdon, told Iowa Governor Dan Turner about the situation being "out of control". The next day, Turner started martial law and had 31 Iowa National Guard units travel to Tipton and their base was at the Tipton fairgrounds.  It cost over $1,000 to send in troops. People heard yells of "Here comes the Army!" and "You farmers better run!" when the troops jumped from the rail cars. Business owners were worried that farmers would boycott them for not wanting to participate.

Soldiers and veterinarians traveled around Cedar County to test cows for tuberculosis. Machine guns were placed facing country roads, sentries patrolled the area, and armed outposts were built. The farmers gave up for the most part due to the soldiers. 50 veterinarians, all working in pairs, gave the injection to 5,000 cattle per day for a week while being protected. A small amount of the tested cows were infected. The veterinarians saw no cows on Lenker's farm due to him selling his 21 cattle to farmer Harry Duffy in Muscatine County. The sale caused issues for Lenker since he was not allowed to interfere with the process or move his cattle. The last of the soldiers left on November 25, 1931. Lenker was charged for contempt of court. Lenker was also charged for conspiracy along with farmer Paul Moore. They were sentenced to up to three-year terms in the Fort Madison, Iowa, penitentiary. Lenker and Moore were paroled 40 days later.

References

1931 protests
History of Iowa
Tuberculosis
Riots and civil disorder in Iowa
1931 riots
History of agriculture in the United States
Bovine health
Agriculture in Iowa
1931 in the United States
1931 in Iowa
September 1931 events
Diseases and disorders in the United States
Political riots in the United States
Cedar County, Iowa